Vautour (French for "vulture") may refer to:

 Abrial A-2 Vautour, a single-seat French glider aircraft of 1925
 Sud Aviation Vautour, a French-made bomber, interceptor, and attack aircraft of the 1950s, 1960s, and 1970s used by the French and Israeli air forces
 Vautour (horse), Irish-trained racehorse
Vautour (ship), one of a number of privateers and naval vessels

People with the surname 
Jackie Vautour (born 1930), Canadian anti-expropriation activist
Angela Vautour (born 1960), Canadian politician
J. R. Vautour, Canadian country singer
Yvon Vautour (born 1956), Canadian ice hockey player